The country of Côte d'Ivoire in Africa has the following national parks and other protected areas.

National parks 

Assagny National Park
Banco National Park
Comoé National Park
Îles Ehotilés National Park
Marahoué National Park
Mont Péko National Park
Mont Sângbé National Park
Taï National Park

See also
Mount Nimba Strict Nature Reserve

External links 
 World Institute for Nature and Environment

Côte d'Ivoire
National parks